Dawson Ritchie (10 May 1920 – 3 July 1994) was a New Zealand cricketer. He played two first-class matches for Auckland in 1943/44.

See also
 List of Auckland representative cricketers

References

External links
 

1920 births
1994 deaths
New Zealand cricketers
Auckland cricketers
Cricketers from Auckland